The Postsecondary Education Network International, known as PEN-International, is an international partnership of colleges and universities serving the higher education of students with hearing impairment.

PEN-International was founded by Dr. James J. DeCaro of the National Technical Institute for the Deaf (NTID) at Rochester Institute of Technology (RIT), with support from the Nippon Foundation in 2001, by two schools which have since been joined by three additional schools.

Lead schools
 United States: Rochester Institute of Technology (RIT), National Technical Institute for the Deaf (NTID), in Rochester, New York.
 Japan: Tsukuba University of Technology (TUT), formerly Tsukuba College of Technology (TCT), Division for the Hearing Impaired, in Tsukuba.

Partner schools
 China: Tianjin University of Technology, Tianjin Technical College for the Deaf, in Tianjin.
 Russia: Bauman Moscow State Technical University, Center on Deafness, in Moscow.
 Philippines: De La Salle–College of Saint Benilde, School of Deaf Education and Applied Studies, in Malate, Manila.

References

 A history of PEN-International by the Nippon Foundation.
 The founding of PEN-International, RIT University News Services, February 22, 2001.
 History of the Tsukuba University of Technology Division for the Hearing Impaired from 1976.
 February 2004 Artist in residence Taiko Drumming program at NTID in Rochester, sponsored by PEN-International with support from the San Francisco Taiko Dojo and Project Insight.

External links
 PEN-International Home Page

Deafness organizations
Organizations established in 2001
Deaf culture
Special education